Andrew Shearer Gehling (born October 16, 1982) is an American stage and screen actor, best known for his role as Dr. Pomatter in the Broadway musical Waitress, Garry Marshall's Billy & Ray, and as the voice of Gord in the 2006 video game Bully from Rockstar Games.

Biography
Gehling grew up in Sedgefield, North Carolina, performing as a child in several shows with the Greensboro Children's Theatre and Livestock Players Youth Theatre. He attended Carnegie Mellon University in Pittsburgh.

After graduating from Carnegie Mellon, Gehling booked “Snow White - An Enchanting Musical” at the Disneyland Resort. 

Gehling made his Broadway debut as Bob Gaudio in Jersey Boys and went on to play Warren Smith in the Broadway revival of On a Clear Day You Can See Forever. He has performed Off-Broadway in A Minister's Wife and Anne of Green Gables. In 2016, he originated the role of Jim Pomatter in the musical Waitress on Broadway, where he remained until April 2, 2017. He returned to star alongside Betsy Wolfe on June 27, 2017. In May - June 2017, he starred as Joe Bradley in Roman Holiday at the Golden Gate Theatre in San Francisco.

He began starring in a new musical Dave at Arena Stage in Washington, D.C., on July 13, 2018, in the dual roles of Dave Kovic and President Bill Mitchell. The musical has music by Tom Kitt, lyrics by Nell Benjamin, and the book by Benjamin and Thomas Meehan.

Personal life
Gehling was previously married to fellow performer and Carnegie Mellon graduate Sara Jean Ford in 2009. They have one daughter together named Anne Kelly Gehling.

Acting credits

Film

Television

Theatre

Video games

References

External links 

Broadway profile

1982 births
Living people
American male stage actors
American male television actors
American male video game actors
Male actors from North Carolina
Carnegie Mellon University alumni
Columbia University alumni